Song of the Sirens (stylized as 回:Song of the Sirens) is the ninth and last extended play by South Korean girl group GFriend, released on July 13, 2020, by Source Music and distributed by kakao M. The EP contains six songs including the lead single "Apple".

Release and promotion 

On June 17, 2020, it was reported that GFriend would come back on July 13 with a new mini-album titled 回:Song of the Sirens. It's the second release of the series "回". A source also reported that: "GFriend recently wrapped up filming the music video for their title track. Throughout the filming, the staff on set were surprised by GFriend’s shocking transformation." Preorders began on June 22. On June 26, the group released the comeback timetable of their album. On June 28, the group released a teaser video titled "A Tale of the Glass Bead: Butterfly Effect" through Hybe Corporation's official YouTube channel. On June 30, GFriend released the first set of concept photos titled "Broken Room". The "Titled" and "Apple" versions of concept photos were released respectively on July 2 and July 4. The tracklist of the album was released on July 6. The highlight medley was released two days later. On July 10, the first teaser of the music video for their lead single "Apple" was uploaded on Hybe Corporation’s YouTube channel. The second teaser was uploaded two days later. The EP was released on July 13 along with the music video for "Apple".

Production and composition 
For "Apple", Yuju and Eunha both participated in composing and writing lyrics for the song. Yuju, Eunha, and Umji participated in writing lyrics for "Tarot Cards", and Yuju and Umji both worked on "Eye of the Storm" together with Umji writing lyrics and Yuju participating in composing the song.

The last track of the album, "Stairs in the North", is based on SinB's personal story. In an interview with ELLE magazine, they talked about how the group discussed with the staff about music, including thoughts about the past, present, future of the group. The song was mainly inspired by the ups and downs of their lives.

Track listing

Charts

Weekly charts

Monthly charts

Accolades

Release history

References

External links
 A Tale of the Glass Bead: Butterfly Effect on YouTube

2020 EPs
Korean-language EPs
GFriend EPs
Kakao M EPs
Hybe Corporation EPs